Khatam Al-Nabieen University is a private university established in 1966, located in the city of Kabul, Afghanistan.

See also
List of universities in Afghanistan
Khatam Al-Nabieen University (Dari: دانشگاه خاتم النبیین) is a private university established in 2006 , located in the city of Kabul, Afghanistan

References

External links
 Khatam Al-Nabieen University (2019 archive)

Educational institutions established in 1966
Universities and colleges in Kabul
Universities in Afghanistan
Private universities in Afghanistan
1966 establishments in Afghanistan